Henry Irby (January 26, 1807 – February 20, 1879) was an American farmer who is credited with founding the city of Buckhead in what is now Atlanta, Georgia.

Biography
The son of a harness maker, Irby was born in York County, South Carolina, on January 26, 1807. In 1833, he married Sardis Walraven, with whom he had two sons. He later moved to Georgia for unknown reasons. On December 18, 1838, Daniel Johnson sold Irby 202.5 acres of land (known as Land Lot No. 99) in what later became Buckhead for $650. Soon after this purchase, Irby established what became known as Irby's Tavern, a combination of a tavern and a grocery store. The previously sparsely-populated area around the tavern became known as Irbyville. Irby remained the owner of Buckhead until his death on February 20, 1879. Irby Avenue in Buckhead is named after him, as is the apartment complex "The Irby" located on that street, which was under construction but nearing completion as of February 2019.

Origin of the name Buckhead
Irby is credited with inadvertently giving Buckhead its name when he prominently displayed the head of a buck that had been shot near his tavern. Several details of this story are uncertain. For example, it is unclear who exactly shot the deer, though it may have been Irby himself, his neighbor John Whitley, or an anonymous Native American. It is also uncertain whether the buck's head was mounted on a yard post or over the door of the tavern. The year of this occurrence is also uncertain, but it was soon after Irby first purchased the area, around 1838 or early 1840.

References

1807 births
1879 deaths
People from York County, South Carolina
American city founders
Businesspeople from Georgia (U.S. state)
Businesspeople from South Carolina
People from Atlanta
19th-century American businesspeople